The Cleveland Blues were a Major League Baseball team based in Cleveland, Ohio that operated in the National League from 1879 to 1884.  In six seasons their best finish was third place in 1880.  Hugh Daily threw a no-hitter for the Blues on September 13, 1883.  Besides Daily, notable Blues players included Jack Glasscock and Baseball Hall of Fame member Ned Hanlon. The team was purchased by Charles Byrne in 1885 for $10,000 and folded into his Brooklyn Grays team.

Baseball Hall of Famers

See also
 1879 Cleveland Blues season
 1880 Cleveland Blues season
 1881 Cleveland Blues season
 1882 Cleveland Blues season
 1883 Cleveland Blues season
 1884 Cleveland Blues season
 Cleveland Blues (NL) all-time roster

References

External links
 Cleveland Blues team index – Baseball-Reference.com

 
Defunct Major League Baseball teams
Defunct baseball teams in Ohio
Baseball teams disestablished in 1884
Baseball teams established in 1879